William Sears may refer to:

William Sears (Baháʼí) (1911–1992), American author, sportscaster and prominent member of the Baháʼí Faith
William Sears (physician) (born 1939), American pediatrician and author
William Sears (politician) (died 1929), Irish politician
William J. Sears (1874–1944), U.S. Representative from Florida
William R. Sears (1913–2002), American aerodynamicist
William R. Sears (New York politician) (1928–1998), New York politician